The following is a partial list of notable Central Philippine University people. The list includes associated people of the university which includes alumni, professors, faculty members and other people who were conferred with honorary degrees which are known as  Centralians. Notable people of the university include:

Alumni and associated people

Presidents of Central

References

Central Philippine University alumni
Central Philippine University people
Central Philippine University
Central Philippine University